Phonse Marshall (29 August 1917 – 25 September 1997) was an Australian rules footballer who played with Geelong in the Victorian Football League (VFL).

Marshall was granted a permit to play with South Melbourne in 1943 but did not play a senior game for them and returned to Geelong  for the 1944 season.

Notes

External links 

1917 births
1997 deaths
Australian rules footballers from Victoria (Australia)
Geelong Football Club players